Prowincja (Polish for "province") is Akurat's second album, released on 1 October 2003.

Track listing
Titles in brackets are translated from Polish.
 "Scena po scenie" (Stage after stage)
 "Wiej-ska" 
 "Jestem tym" (I'm this)
 "Roman i Julia" (Roman and Julia)
 "Piekarnik" (Oven)
 "Balet" (Ballet)
 "Ślepe losy" (Blind fates)
 "Oni mówią mi" (They tell me)
 "Wielki plan" (The great plan)
 "Bajka o Księżycu" (Fable about the Moon)
 "Wolny 2003" (Free 2003)
 "Do prostego człowieka" 
 "Kapitał" (Capital)

Singles
 "Do prostego człowieka"
 "Wiej-ska"

Credits
 Łukasz Gocal – drums
 Ireneusz Wojnar – bass guitar
 Tomasz Kłaptocz – vocals, trumpet
 Piotr Wróbel – guitar
 Wojciech Żółty – guitar
 Przemysław Zwias – saxophone

Notes
  "Wiejska" is a feminine adjective form of "wieś", which means village. In this case, title refers to street Wiejska in Warsaw, where the Polish Sejm building is situated. Words is divided into two: "wiej" (in this case hasn't got any meaning) and "ska", which symbolise genre ska.
  "Do prostego człowieka" is a title of Julian Tuwim's poem, translated to English as "The Common Man".

External links
 

Akurat albums
2003 albums